Jai Narain Vyas University (JNVU, formerly known as University of Jodhpur) is an educational institution in Jodhpur city in the Indian state of Rajasthan. Established in 1962, the university took over the four colleges of Jodhpur run by the state government.

The institution is the only residential university in the state, catering mainly to the needs of students of western Rajasthan (Marwar). Its research and development activities focus on the heritage, society, and challenges of the Thar Desert region, in which it is located. As the westernmost university of the country, research is conducted in border areas with Pakistan.

History

Jai Narain Vyas University is the second university in the State of Rajasthan. The university was established in 1962 by the Jodhpur University Act (Act XVII), enacted by the State Legislature for the Unitary Teaching University. It It received University Grants Commission (UGC) recognition as a university on 14 July 1962. Sarvepalli Radhakrishnan opened the university on 24 August 1962.

The university began operations in June 1962 when it took over the four colleges of Jodhpur run by the state government. These colleges were:
Jaswant College (campus of the Faculty of Commerce) 
Shri Maharaj Kumar College (campus of the Faculty of Law, Institute of Evening Studies, and undergraduate studies of the Faculty of Arts)
 M.B.M. Engineering College (campus of the Faculty of Engineering) 
Kamla Nehru Girls College (the university's multi-faculty constituent college)

The first two colleges were converted into the Faculties of Arts, Commerce, Law, Science and Social Sciences; the other two colleges retained their identity and function and have been designated as the MBM Engineering College and Kamla Nehru College for Women.

Shah G.L. Kabra Teacher's Training College was a private college at the time of the university's founding. It is now one of the affiliated colleges of the university.

On 12 February 1992, the name of the institution was changed from Jodhpur University to Jai Narain Vyas University.

In 2021, M.B.M. Engineering College was elevated to the status of university, now known as M.B.M. University.

K. L. Shrivastava was appointed Vice Chancellor (VC) in February 2022.

Campus
The Jai Narain Vyas University has five campuses.  New Campus has a science faculty and laboratories. It houses Faculty of Arts, Education and Social Sciences, laboratories, the university press, USIC, central library, maintenance cell, gymnasium and sports facilities, and hostels for males and post-graduate females. The four original colleges serve as satellite campuses.

Courses
The university provides education and research facilities to the residents of the region and to the wards of defense and paramilitary forces along the border of Pakistan. Courses are offered in humanities, sciences, social sciences, law, engineering, commerce and business management, information technology, and languages. There are more than 40 postgraduate programs, 30 undergraduate programs, and 5 diploma and certificate courses.

Faculties
The university has several colleges and institutes offering courses under the following faculties:

Faculty of Arts
The departments of Faculty of Arts, Education and Social Sciences impart education and training in linguistic studies in English, French, Hindi, Rajasthani, and Sanskrit. Besides teaching, it fosters research on contemporary topics promoting socio-economic development. The education and training have generated manpower useful in fields including foreign affairs, intelligence services, strategic areas and economy.

Institute of Evening Studies
The Institute of Evening Studies provides evening classes to working candidates pursuing higher qualifications, suited to market demands.

Educational Multimedia Research Centre
The Educational Multimedia Research Centre (EMMRC) produces films for UGC-CWCR of the university and has received national recognition for its contribution in electronic media. The centre is fully funded by the University Grants Commission.

Faculty of Science

The Faculty of Science and its departments study the natural resources of the Indian Desert and the Aravallies. Botany, chemistry, geology and physics are DST FIST sponsored departments. The Department of Geology is actively involved in exploration and exploitation of earth resources of these regions, including oil, minerals and ground water. With the help of UGC and other funding agencies like CSIR, Depart of Biotechnology, Department of Electronics, Defence Research Development Organisation, Department of Science and Technology, Indian Council of Agricultural Research, Indian Council of Forest Research Establishment and Indian Space Research Organisation, the faculty's departments have acquired sophisticated equipment and facilities like field stations, greenhouses, and a micro-propagation laboratory.

The Departments of Botany and Zoology are working on conservation of the threatened and endangered species of the region.

The Department of Chemistry has been working on chemistry of natural products and for the development of tie and dye industry, environmental remediation, designing of devices for storage of energy and for promoting chemical and natural product based industries.

The Departments of Physics and Mathematics are working in collaboration with agencies including Defence Research & Development Organisation for development of scientific methods for teaching, education, and use in science-based industries and defence. The Department of Physics is working on aspects of material sciences in collaboration with DRDO and Bhabha Atomic Research Center.

The Faculty of Science and its departments have collaborations/MOUs with industries, governmental and non-governmental organisations in development and use of technologies based on science and resources generated in the university.

Faculty of Commerce and Management Studies
The Faculty of Commerce and Management Studies has produced many CAs, managers, executives, teachers and scholars. It has departments of business administration, accounting, finance, and management studies, and has specialised courses in hotel management and tourism. The faculty received the 'Escorts Award'.

Department of Management Studies
In 1989–90 a separate Department of Management Studies (DMS) was created with the responsibility of an MBA program, one of the first such programs in the country and a contemporary of IIMs. It is located in the Jaswant Campus in a sprawling building with seminar rooms and a computer centre.

Affiliated colleges
Its jurisdiction extends over 5 districts - Barmer,Jaisalmer,JAlore,Jodhpur,PAli    .

 Adarsh Mahavidyalaya
 Aishwarya College
 Aman Mahila Teachers Training College
 Atmanand Teachers Training College
 Bharat Women B.Ed. College
 Central Modern Women Teachers Training College
 Chopasani Teachers Training College
 Dr. Radha Krishnan Women Teachers Training College
 G.D. Memorial College
 Gomi Devi Women Teachers Training College
 Gurukul Institute of Commerce and Advance Courses
 Gyandeep Shodh Avam Shikshan Sansthan
 HK Hitech College
 Holy sprite Institute of Technology, Science & Research College
 Jai Narain Mahila Mahavidyalaya
 Jai Narain Vyas Mahila (P.G.) Mahavidhyalaya
 JIET College for Girls
 Kumodini Mahila Shikshak Prakshikshan Mahavidyalaya
 Lachoo Memorial College of Science & technology
 Lucky Institute of Professional Studies
 Ma Saraswati B.Ed. College
 Maharshi Dadhichi Mahila Mahavidyalaya
MBR COLLEGE BALOTRA
 Mahila Teachers Training College
 Marwar Shikshak Prakshikshan Mahavidyalaya
 Maulana Azad Muslim Mahila TeachersTraining College
 Mayurakshi Women Teachers TrainingCollege
 Nakoda Parshvanath Jain Mahavidyalaya
 Onkarmal Somani College of Commerce
 Shah Govardhan Lal Kabra Teachers College (C.T.E.)
 Shanti Devi B.Ed. College
 Vyas B.Ed. College
 Vyas College of Commerce
 Vidhyashram Institute of Teachers Training
 Umrao B.Ed. College
 Trinity Women Teachers Training College
 Thomas Cangon Teachers Training College
 All College of Barmer, Jaisalmer, Pali, Jalore District

Notable alumni

Politics and Law 

Science

See also
List of institutions of higher education in Rajasthan

References

External links

1962 establishments in Rajasthan
Educational institutions established in 1962
Universities in Jodhpur